"Moral Code X" or "Moralny Kodex" is a Russian rock band founded in 1989 by famous Moscow producer and poet Pavel Zhagun and saxophonist Sergey Mazayev to play reactive big beat.

The debut album by Moralny Kodex was called Sotryasenie Mozga (Russian for brain concussion), and was filled with strict big-beat drums in combination with INXS-like guitar riffs and lyrics by Pavel Zhagun.  The song Do Svidanya, Mama (Russian for Goodbye mama) became a main single of this album. Several video clips were shot in 1990.
 
In the early 1990s, Moralny Kodex was recognized as the most promising and popular rock band in Russia but their second album Gibkij Stan (here  Slender Body) wasn't very successful.  Some in-band disagreements appeared after this release, due to frontman Sergey Mazayev's problems with alcohol.  The band temporarily left the Russian mainstream scene.

Their third album was entitled I Choose You. It included two hit tracks:  Ya vybiraju tebja and Nochnoy kapriz (Russian for I choose you and Night caprise  respectively).

In 1997 Moralny Kodex started recording their fourth album, Good News,  which was finally released in 2000. This album had a brand-new sound and a lot of hit songs. It was a revival for the band.

In 2004 drummer Yuriy Kistenev left the band, and Mazaev invited new drummer Zack Sullivan from New York City.  After a while the band made some new recordings for the next album at the Abbey Road Studios in London. Chris Kimsey, who worked with Rolling Stones and INXS, was the record producer for the album Slavianskie Tancy.

The band played a popular set on the Moscow stage as part of the 2005 Live 8 concert.

In February 2014, released sixth studio album, Winter.

Members

 Sergey Mazayev — Vocals, Sax, Flute
 Nikolay Devlet-Kildeyev — Guitar
 Alexander Solich — Bass guitar
 Konstantin Smirnov — Keyboard, percussion
 Yuriy Kistenyov — Drums
 Pavel Zhagun — Poet, musician and media artist, creative art producer

References

External links 

 
 Mazay.tv
 Myspace

Russian rock music groups
Musical groups established in 1989
Soviet rock music groups
Winners of the Golden Gramophone Award